The 1963–64 DFB-Pokal was the 21st season of the annual German football cup competition. It began on 7 April 1964 and ended on 13 June 1964. 32 teams competed in the tournament of five rounds. In the final 1860 Munich defeated Eintracht Frankfurt 2–0.

Matches

First round

Replays

Round of 16

Quarter-finals

Semi-finals

Final

References

External links
 Official site of the DFB 
 Kicker.de 
 1964 results at Fussballdaten.de 
 1964 results at Weltfussball.de 

1963-64
1963–64 in German football cups